Manuel Gomes may refer to:

 Manuel Teixeira Gomes (1860–1941), Portuguese politician and writer
 Manuel Gomes (boxer) (born 1966), Angolan Olympic boxer
 Manuel Gomes (football coach) (born 1951), Portuguese football manager
 Manuel António Gomes (1868–1933), Portuguese physicist
 Manuel Pedro Gomes (born 1941), former Portuguese footballer
 Manel Kape (born 1993), born Manuel Pedro Gomes, Angolan mixed martial artist

See also
Manuel Gómez (disambiguation)